Eurythmia fumella is a species of snout moth in the genus Eurhodope. It was described by Charles Russell Ely in 1910 and is known from North America, including Illinois.

References

Moths described in 1910
Phycitinae